Statistics of National Association Foot Ball League in season 1920-21.

League standings
                               GP   W   L   T   Pts
 Bethlehem Steel      12  11   0   1   23
 New York F.C.             11   8   2   1   17
 Brooklyn Robins Dry Dock  12   5   5   2   12
 Kearny Federal Ship       10   3   4   3    9
 Kearny Erie A.A.           9   3   4   2    8
 Bayonne Babcock & Wilcox  12   2   9   1    5
 Philadelphia Disston       9   1   6   2    4
 Bunker Hill F.C.           3   0   3   0    0

References
NATIONAL ASSOCIATION FOOT BALL LEAGUE (RSSSF)

1920-21
1920–21 domestic association football leagues
1920–21 in American soccer